KBEO, VHF digital channel 11, was a Retro TV-affiliated television station licensed to Jackson, Wyoming, United States. The station was owned by KM Communications Inc.

History
KBEO signed on March 30, 2001. The station originally operated separately as an America One affiliate, but became a satellite of Pocatello, Idaho station KPIF, after that station opened in March 2004.

Because it was granted an original construction permit after the Federal Communications Commission (FCC) finalized the DTV allotment plan on April 21, 1997, KBEO did not receive a companion channel for digital television stations. Instead, on June 12, 2009, which was the end of the digital TV conversion period for full-service stations, KBEO was to have turned off its analog signal and turned on its digital signal (called a "flash-cut").

On July 16, 2010, KBEO ceased broadcasting due to financial problems.  However, it had failed to apply for a digital license to cover or extension of the construction permit; furthermore, the analog signal had left the air for good, also for financial reasons, on September 24, 2008.  As a result, on July 27, 2010, the FCC canceled KBEO's license.

References

Television channels and stations established in 2001
2001 establishments in Wyoming
Television channels and stations disestablished in 2010
2010 disestablishments in Wyoming
Defunct television stations in the United States
BEO
BEO